Newbury State is an unincorporated community in Geauga County, in the U.S. state of Ohio. It is a rural suburb of Cleveland.

History
A variant name is Newbury. A post office called Newbury has been in operation since 1823. The name Newbury is derived from Newburyport, Massachusetts.

Education
Newbury is part of the West Geauga School District which is based in bordering Chester Township

Notable people
Coyote Peterson, YouTube personality and wildlife educator

References

Unincorporated communities in Geauga County, Ohio
Unincorporated communities in Ohio